Michael Gerard Jenkins (born June 18, 1982) is a former American football wide receiver in the National Football League (NFL). He was drafted in the first round of the 2004 NFL Draft by the Atlanta Falcons and also played for the Minnesota Vikings. He played college football at Ohio State University.

Early years
Jenkins attended A.P. Leto High School in Tampa, Florida where he was a record-breaking track star. He received many awards for his outstanding athletic performance, stellar academic achievement, and school leadership.

College career
Jenkins became a three-year starter for the Ohio State Buckeyes, starting 38 of his final 39 games, he caught 165 passes for 2,898 yards with a 17.6 average, and scored 16 touchdowns in his career.  He finished his career with at least one reception in 38 consecutive games and helped the Buckeyes capture the 2002 BCS National Championship at the 2003 Fiesta Bowl.

His 2,898 yards rank eighth on the Big Ten Conference career-record list, while also topping the previous school career-record of 2,855 by David Boston. Jenkins earned an All-Big Ten Conference honorable mention as a senior after leading the team with 55 receptions for 834 yards with a 15.2 average and 7 touchdowns while adding 178 yards and a touchdown on 20 punt returns. He was also an All-Big Ten Conference second-team choice as a junior after leading the team with a career-high 61 receptions for 1,076 yards (17.6 average) and 6 touchdowns.

During the 2002 Ohio State National championship season, Jenkins made one of the biggest and most memorable catches in Buckeye history, the "Holy Buckeye" play at Purdue.  In the first overtime period of Ohio State's victory in the 2002 BCS National Championship game over the Miami Hurricanes, Jenkins caught a pass on 4th and 14 from Craig Krenzel that gave the Buckeyes a first down and eventually allowed the Buckeyes to prevail 31-24 in two overtimes.

Professional career

Atlanta Falcons

2004 season
Jenkins played in all 16 games of his rookie season, recording seven receptions for 119 yards. His 17.0 average led the team and his eight special teams tackles ranked fourth. He made his first NFL reception for 46 yards against the Denver Broncos.

2005 season
With the slump and eventual release of wide receiver Peerless Price, the Falcons turned to Jenkins to start. Although Falcons quarterback Michael Vick turned to him more often, Jenkins was not a gigantic factor in the Falcons' less-than-stellar offense for the 2005 season. He played in 14 games and started 12 of them after Price left for the Dallas Cowboys. Jenkins made his first career start against the Philadelphia Eagles, leading the team with three grabs for 80 yards. He improved from his rookie season, catching 38 passes for 506 yards. He also caught three touchdowns, the first against the ailing Buffalo Bills.

2006 season
Jenkins started all 16 games for the first time in his career and registered 436 receiving yards on a then career-high 39 catches with a career-high seven touchdowns. He led the team with 77 receiving yards on 3 receptions (25.7 average), including a 34-yard touchdown catch in the season opener against the Carolina Panthers.

2007 season
Jenkins had 53 receptions for 532 yards and four touchdowns in his fourth year with the team. He tallied a season-high 76 receiving yards on six receptions against the Carolina Panthers and posted six catches for 64 yards with a career-high two touchdowns against the Houston Texans. Jenkins reached a career-high nine receptions for a team-high 73 yards against the Tampa Bay Buccaneers, and tied a career-high with nine grabs for a career-high 83 yards against the New Orleans Saints.

2008 season

Jenkins caught the first pass of rookie quarterback Matt Ryan's NFL career and took it for a 62-yard touchdown against the Detroit Lions. Jenkins caught a pass and ran out of bounds, stopping the clock with 1 second left and allowing Jason Elam to successfully convert a 48-yard field goal to defeat the Chicago Bears during their week 6 game.

Jenkins set a new career high in receiving yards in 2008 with 777.

2009 season
Jenkins started for the Falcons in 2009. He finished the season with 50 receptions, 635 yards, and a touchdown.

2010 season
After suffering an injury in an offseason team scrimmage, Michael Jenkins would miss 4 to 6 weeks. As a result, Jenkins started just 9 regular season games for the Falcons in 2010, finishing with 41 receptions for 505 yards and 2 touchdown receptions. Atlanta finished with the best record in the NFC at 13-3, but the Falcons were upset by the eventual Super Bowl Champion Green Bay Packers in the Divisional Playoffs. In the 48-21 loss to Green Bay, Jenkins recorded 6 receptions for 67 yards.

2011 season
On July 29, 2011, Jenkins was released by the Atlanta Falcons. A day later, he signed with the Minnesota Vikings.

He was placed on injured reserve on November 29, 2011. He caught 38 passes for 466 yards and scored 3 touchdowns during the season.

Minnesota Vikings
Jenkins was signed by the Vikings for a 3-year contract. In week 7 of that year, Jenkins caught a 72-yard pass on the first play of the game, only to be tackled at the 1 yard line.
Jenkins had 38 receptions for 466 yards that season. The Vikings would go on to tie the worst season in franchise history, with a 3-13 record.

2012 season and playoffs
Jenkins returned with the Vikings in 2012. Minnesota was 9-6 in week 17 and had to beat the Green Bay Packers to advance to the playoffs. Jenkins caught a diving touchdown in the 4th quarter that gave the Vikings the lead. The Vikings would go on to win that game 37-34, only to lose to the Packers in the first round of playoffs the following week.

On March 4, 2013, Jenkins was released by the Vikings.

New England Patriots
Jenkins signed with the New England Patriots on March 28, 2013. He was released on August 15, 2013.

Personal
Jenkins and his wife, Toya, currently reside in Georgia.  A graduate of A. P. Leto High School in Tampa, Jenkins donated football uniforms to his alma mater in 2008, telling the St. Petersburg Times, "You're always kind of fighting for your school".

References

External links

ESPN.com profile

1982 births
Living people
Players of American football from Tampa, Florida
American football wide receivers
Ohio State Buckeyes football players
Atlanta Falcons players
Minnesota Vikings players
New England Patriots players
A.P. Leto High School alumni